Joseph Barsalou may refer to:
 Joseph Barsalou (physician) (1600–1660), French apothecary and physician
 Joseph Barsalou (businessman) (1822–1897), businessman and politician from Montreal